The year 1891 in science and technology involved some significant events, listed below.

Biology
 March 3 – Yellowstone Timberland Reserve, predecessor of Shoshone National Forest, in Wyoming is established as the first United States National Forest.
 The New Zealand government sets aside Resolution Island in Fiordland as a nature reserve.
 The New York Botanical Garden is founded in The Bronx largely due to the efforts of Nathaniel Lord Britton.
 Jane Willis Kirkaldy and Catherine Pollard become the first women to sit final examinations in biology at the University of Oxford (and achieve first class honours).

Chemistry
 Agnes Pockels first publishes the results of her researches into surface tension.
 The Fischer projection is devised by German chemist Hermann Emil Fischer,

Geology
Hans Reusch describes what comes to be known as Reusch's Moraine in northern Norway; tillite from a Precambrian glaciation.

Environment
The Japan Meteorological Agency begins taking records of the global average temperature.

Mathematics
 Fyodorov–Schoenflies theorem concluded by Yevgraf Fyodorov and Arthur Schoenflies from their work on crystallographic groups.
 Édouard Lucas first formulates the ménage problem.

Medicine
 Julius Ludwig August Koch begins publication of Die psychopathischen Minderwertigkeiten in Ravensburg, introducing the concept of psychopathology.
 Arnold Pick first uses the term dementia praecox in this form.
 Myxedema is first treated successfully, by George Redmayne Murray using thyroid extract.
 The earliest recorded attempt at hip replacement is carried out by Themistocles Gluck in Berlin, using ivory to replace the femoral head.
 Viennese pathologist Hans Chiari describes a form of Chiari malformation.

Paleontology
 October – Eugène Dubois finds the first fragmentary bones of Pithecanthropus erectus (later redesignated Homo erectus), or 'Java Man', at Trinil on the Solo River.

Technology
 March 10 – Almon B. Strowger, an undertaker in Topeka, Kansas, is granted a patent in the United States for an automatic telephone exchange using the Strowger switch.
 May 20 – First public demonstration of the Kinetograph moving picture system developed by W. K. L. Dickson under the direction of Thomas Alva Edison, a showing of the film known as Dickson Greeting. Edison files patents on the camera and peephole viewer on August 24.
 Crompton & Co. introduce the electric kettle, in the United Kingdom.
 Michelin patent the removable pneumatic bicycle tire.
 Panhard et Levassor produce the first Système Panhard automobile layout, consisting of four wheels with front-engine, rear-wheel drive and a sliding-gear transmission, designed by Émile Levassor.
 William Le Baron Jenney develops the construction of steel frame skyscrapers in Chicago with the Ludington, Manhattan and Second Leiter Buildings.
 The modern taximeter is invented by Friedrich Wilhelm Gustav Bruhn in Germany.

Awards
 Copley Medal: Stanislao Cannizzaro
 Wollaston Medal for Geology: John Wesley Judd

Births
 April 22 – Harold Jeffreys (died 1989), English mathematician.
 July 5 – John Howard Northrop (suicide 1987), American biochemist, winner of the Nobel Prize in Chemistry (1946)
 August 17 – Aly Tewfik Shousha (died 1964), Egyptian bacteriologist.
 September 14 – Ivan Matveyevich Vinogradov (died 1983), Russian mathematician.
 September 24 – W. F. Friedman (died 1969), Bessarabian-born cryptanalyst.
 October 24 – Ernest Melville DuPorte (died 1981), Caribbean-born Canadian insect morphologist.
 November 14 – Frederick Banting (died 1941), Canadian discoverer of insulin, winner of the Nobel Prize in Physiology or Medicine (1923).

Deaths
 January 6 – Hugh Owen Thomas (born 1834), British orthopaedic surgeon.
 February 10 – Sofia Kovalevskaya (born 1850), Russian mathematician.
 March 9 – Amalie Dietrich (born 1821), German naturalist.
 May 11 – Edmond Becquerel (born 1820), French physicist.
 June 9 – Henry Edwards (born 1827), English-born American entomologist and actor.
 June 23
 Sir Norman Pogson (born 1829), English-born astronomer.
 Wilhelm Eduard Weber (born 1804), German physicist.
 August 30 – Emanoil Bacaloglu (born 1830), Romanian polymath.
 September 18 – William Ferrel (born 1817), American meteorologist.
 October 3 – Édouard Lucas (born 1842), French mathematician.
 November 18 – Joseph Wolstenholme (born 1829), English mathematician.
 December 21 – William Cavendish, 7th Duke of Devonshire (born 1808), English landowner and promoter of science.

References

 
19th century in science
1890s in science